Kizhakke Potta Kesava Menon (1 September 1886 – 9 November 1978) was a patriot, idealist and Indian independence activist. Menon was the founder of Mathrubhumi, a popular daily newspaper which earned the second place in circulation in Kerala. In 1924, he led the Vaikom Satyagraha in Travancore. He was awarded the third highest civilian honour, Padma Bhushan, by the Government of India in 1966. He was conferred with an honorary doctorate (D.Litt) posthumously by University of Calicut in 1987.

Early life
He was born in Tharoor village of Palghat as the son of Naduviledathil Bheemanachan and Meenakshi Amma. He graduated in Arts from Madras University and Bar-at-law from Middle Temple.

Career

Activism
After his education, he became the secretary of Malabar Home rule League. He joined the Indian National Congress in 1915 and served as the secretary of the Malabar branch of the Home Rule League after setting up practice in Calicut. He was a member of the Home Rule League under Annie Besant which proceeded to London to present a memorandum to the Secretary of State in 1917. He also wrote a dozen of books and collections of essays. In 1919, in Madras he organised sweepers and rikshaw drivers.  He was among the earliest in Kerala to argue for abolition of  'untouchability'

Mathrubhumi 
Kesava Menon established Mathrubhumi in 1923. He was its Chief Editor from the beginning till his death, except for a brief interregnum he moved out of Kerala and went to practice law in Malaysia and Singapore. There also he was actively involved in nationalist movements. His autobiography has been published by Mathrubhumi Books.

Personal life 
Kesava Menon married Akathethara Manikyamelidam Laxmi Nethyaramma. Palakkatsseri Valiyaraja Manikyamelidam Shekhari Varma (the former Maharajah of Palghat) was the second of his five children (Since the first and second Rajas are residing outside India, it was the third Raja, KK Itti Pangi Achan who performed the religious duties on their behalf). The other four children are: Chellamma, Thankam, Padmini and Leela.

References

External links 
 

1886 births
Indian independence activists from Kerala
Indian National Congress politicians from Kerala
Malayali people
People from Palakkad district
1978 deaths
Recipients of the Sahitya Akademi Award in Malayalam
Recipients of the Padma Bhushan in public affairs
Malayalam-language journalists
Government Victoria College, Palakkad alumni
Recipients of the Kerala Sahitya Akademi Award